Mathilda Twomey (née Butler-Payette) is a Seychellois lawyer and academic. She is the first female judge in the history of Seychelles and also the first woman to be appointed Chief Justice of the Supreme Court of Seychelles.

Early life and education
Twomey was born in Mahé, Seychelles. She holds a degree in French law from the University of Paris-Sud, France; and also a Bachelors of Arts degree in English and French Law which she obtained from the University of Kent, Canterbury, U.K. She was admitted as a Member of the Bar at Middle Temple, London and as an attorney-at-law in Seychelles in 1987. She holds a master's degree programme in Public Law from the National University of Ireland; and in 2015, she completed her Ph.D from the same institution.

Career
In 1987, Twomey started her career as a legal practitioner by first serving as a barrister in the Ocean Gate Law Centre. She has also worked in the Attorney General’s Chambers and as an attorney-at-law in private chambers. She was one of the selected members of the Constitutional Commission who were instrumental in drafting the Constitution of the Third Republic between 1992-1993. In 1996, she also worked as regional coordinator for Multiple Sclerosis Ireland, upon moving to Ireland in 1995.

On 13 April 2011, she became the first female judge in Seychelles after she was sworn in as a non-resident judge; and on 18 August 2015, she also became the first woman to be appointed Chief Judge of the Supreme Court of Seychelles after she was sworn in at the State House, Victoria, succeeding Frederick Egonda-Ntende. Her mandate as Chief Justice ended in September 2020.

Published books
Legal Métissage in a Micro-Jurisdiction: The Mixing of Common Law and Civil Law in Seychelles (2017)

See also 
 First women lawyers around the world

References 

Living people
Chief justices of Seychelles
Seychellois lawyers
Seychellois judges
Members of the Middle Temple
Alumni of the University of Kent
Paris-Sud University alumni
Alumni of the University of Galway
People from Mahé, Seychelles
Seychellois women lawyers
Women chief justices
Year of birth missing (living people)